Even Cowgirls Get the Blues may refer to:

 Even Cowgirls Get the Blues (novel), a novel by Tom Robbins
 Even Cowgirls Get the Blues (film), a 1993 film based on the novel
 Even Cowgirls Get the Blues (Lynn Anderson album), a 1980 album by Lynn Anderson, or the title song (see next)
 "Even Cowgirls Get the Blues" (song), a song covered by:
 Emmylou Harris for Blue Kentucky Girl (1979)
 Lynn Anderson for her album of the same name
 Johnny Cash & Waylon Jennings in their album Heroes
 Chris Ledoux (1982)
 Rodney Crowell (1993)
 "Even Cowgirls Get the Blues", a song by Robbin Thompson (1980)
 Even Cowgirls Get the Blues (John Cale album), an album by John Cale, or the title song (1987)
 "Even Cowgirls Get the Blues", a song by The Gaslight Anthem from The '59 Sound (2008)